Eastbourne F.C. may refer to:

 Eastbourne Borough F.C., in the Conference South league as of the 2013–14 season
 Eastbourne Town F.C., in the Isthmian League, Division One South as of the 2013–14 season, called Eastbourne F.C. until 1971
 Eastbourne United Association F.C., in the Sussex County League, Division Two as of the 2013–14 season